was a Japanese daimyō of Gamō clan, the Sengoku period through Azuchi–Momoyama periods. Katahide, the eldest son of Gamō Sadahide, was a retainer of the Rokkaku clan and later Oda clan. His son, Gamō Ujisato, became daimyo of the Aizu Domain and his daughter, Tora known as Sanjo-dono was one of Toyotomi Hideyoshi concubine.

In 1568, Oda Nobunaga, who was en route to Kyoto, defeated the Rokkaku clan. Upon the Rokkaku clan's defeat, Katahide as a former influential vassal, pledged loyalty to Nobunaga, and became an Oda retainer. However, the price of Katahide's pledge was giving up his son as a hostage, and so Gamō Ujisato was taken to Gifu, then the Oda clan's headquarters.

In 1570, Following the betrayal of Azai Nagamasa, Gamō Katahide assisted in Nobunaga's withdrawal from Kanegasaki by taking him into his own Hino Castle, and facilitating his escape to Gifu from there. In recognition of this feat, Nobunaga gave Katahide and his son a stipend increase, and posted them to southern Omi, under the command of Shibata Katsuie.

Family
 Father: Gamō Sadahide (1508–1579)
 Mother: Mabuchi family's daughter
 Wife: daughter of Goto Katatoyo
 Concubine: Okiri no Kata
 Children:
 Gamō Ujinobu
 Gamō Ujiharu
 Gamō Ujisato by Okiri no Kata
 Gamō Shigesato
 Gamō Sadahide
 Sanjo-dono, become a concubine of Toyotomi Hideyoshi
 daughter married Ogura Yukiharu
 daughter married Tamaru Naomasa
 daughter married Seki Kazumasa

Daimyo
1534 births
1584 deaths
Gamō clan